Lake Peipus; is the largest trans-boundary lake in Europe, lying on the border between Estonia and Russia.

The lake is the fifth-largest in Europe after Lake Ladoga and Lake Onega (in Russia north of Saint Petersburg), Lake Vänern (in Sweden), and Lake Saimaa (in Finland).

The lake is a remnant of water regularly collecting at the foot of large, perennial arctic ice sheets during recent ice ages. The lake has several islands and consists of three parts:

Lake Pihkva / Pskovskoye, the southern part of the lake (area  or 20%)
Lake Lämmi / Tyoploye, the sound connecting the other two parts of the lake (area  or 7%)

The lake is used for fishing and recreation, but suffered from environmental degradation from Soviet-era agriculture. Some 30 rivers and streams discharge into Lake Peipus. The largest rivers are the Emajõgi and the Velikaya. The lake drains into the Gulf of Finland via the river Narva.

In 1242 the lake was the site of the Battle on the Ice between the Teutonic Knights and Novgorodians under Prince Alexander Nevsky.

Formation

The lake is a remnant of a larger body of water which existed in this area during a former ice age. In the Paleozoic Era, 300–400 million years ago, the entire territory of the modern Gulf of Finland was covered by a sea. Its modern relief was formed as a result of glacier activities, the last of which, the Weichselian glaciation, ended about 12,000 years ago.

Topography and hydrography
The banks of Lake Peipus have smooth contours and form only one large bay – Raskopelsky Bay. There are sand dunes and hills covered with pine forests.

The relief of the bottom is uniform and flat, gradually rising near the shores and covered with silt, and in some places with sand.

The lake is well-flowing, with the annual inflow of water equal to about half of the total water volume.

The lake water is fresh, with a low transparency of about  due to plankton and suspended sediments caused by the river flow. Water currents are weak ; generally induced by wind, so stop when it ceases. However, during the spring flood, there is a constant surface current from north to south.

Because of the shallow depth, the lake quickly warms and cools. Water temperature reaches  in July. The lakes freeze in late November – early December and thaw in late April – early May, first lakes Teploe and Pihkva and then lake Peipus. However, due to recent climatic changes, Lake Peipus has now commonly started to freeze later into December and thaw much earlier in April.

Basin and islands
About 30 rivers flow into the lake. The largest are Velikaya and Emajõgi; smaller rivers include Zadubka, Cherma, Gdovka, Kuna, Torokhovka, Remda, Rovya, Zhelcha, Chernaya, Lipenka, Startseva, Borovka, Abija, Obdeh, Piusa, Võhandu, Kodza, Kargaya, Omedu, Tagajõgi and Alajõgi. The lake is drained by only one river, the Narva, into the Baltic Sea.

The lake contains 29 islands, with a total area of 25.8 km2, with 40 more islands located within the delta of the Velikaya River. The islands are low wetlands, elevated above the lake surface on average by only  (maximum ) and therefore suffer from floods. The largest islands are Piirissaar (area , located in the southern part of Lake Peipus), Kolpina (area 11 km2, in the Pihkva Lake) and Kamenka (area 6 km2). In the center of Pihkva Lake there is a group of Talabski Islands (Talabsk, Talabenets and Verkhniy).

Flora and fauna
The lake hosts 54 species of coastal aquatic flora, including cane, calamus (Acorus calamus), bulrush, grass rush, lesser bulrush (Typha angustifolia) and water parsnip (Sium latifolium). Floating plants are rare and are of only three types: arrowhead, yellow water-lily and water knotweed. The lake is home to perch, pike-perch, bream, roaches, whitefishes,  smelt and other species of fish. The wetlands of the coastal strip of the lake are important resting and feeding grounds for swans, geese and ducks migrating between the White Sea and Baltic Sea and western Europe. Lake Peipsi is one of the main stopovers for Bewick's swan (Cygnus columbianus). Bewick's rarely fly more than  without fueling so they are near to the limits of their endurance when they reach the lake.

Ecology
The ecological condition of the lake basin is, in general, satisfactory – water is mostly of grades I and II (clean), and is of grade III in some rivers due to the high content of phosphorus. The water condition of the rivers has improved since 2001–2007, but there is an increase in population of blue-green algae. The main problem of Lake Peipus is its eutrophication.

Economy
The towns standing on the banks are relatively small and include Mustvee (population 1,610),  Kallaste (population 1,260) and Gdov (population 4,400). The largest city, Pskov (population 202,000) stands on the river Velikaya,  from the lake. Ship navigation is well developed and serves fishery, transport of goods and passengers and tourist tours. The picturesque shores of the lake are a popular destination for tourism and recreation at several tourist camps and sanatoriums.

History
In 1242, the southern part of Lake Peipus hosted a major historical battle where Teutonic Knights were defeated by Novgorod troops led by Alexander Nevsky. The battle is remarkable in that it was mostly fought on the frozen surface of the lake and is therefore called the Battle on the Ice.

The largest city on the lake, Pskov, is also one of the oldest cities in Russia, known from at least 903 AD from a record in the Primary Chronicle of the Laurentian Codex. The city had a certain measure of independence even though it was dominated by its neighbours - Novgorod, Lithuania and Muscovy - and eventually incorporated in the Russian state. Several historical buildings remain in the city, including Mirozhsky Monastery (1156, which contains famous frescoes of 14–17th centuries), Pskov Kremlin (14–17th centuries) with the five-domed Trinity Cathedral (1682–1699), churches of Ivanovo (until 1243), Snetogorsky monastery (13th century), Church of Basil (1413), Church of Cosmas and Damian (1462), Church of St. George (1494)  and others.

Gdov was founded in 1431 as a fortress and became a city in 1780; the only remains of the historical Gdov Kremlin are three fortress walls. Kallaste was founded in the 18th century by the Old Believers who had fled from the Novgorod area, and there is still a functional Russian Orthodox Old-Rite Church in the town.

References

External links

360° aerial panorama of Peipus and Piirissaar
Peipsi Infokeskus Estonian tourist information website
Settlements in the vicinity of Lake Peipsi Estonica

Estonia–Russia border
International lakes of Europe
Lakes of Estonia
Lakes of Pskov Oblast
Lakes of Jõgeva County
Lakes of Tartu County
LPeipus